The Executive Council of Andorra is the chief executive body of Andorra. 

Under the 1993 constitution, the co-princes continue as heads of state, but the head of government retains executive power. The two co-princes serve coequally with limited powers that do not include veto over government acts. Both are represented in Andorra by a delegate, although since 1993, both France and Spain have their own embassies. As co-princes of Andorra, the president of France and the bishop of Urgell maintain supreme authority in approval of all international treaties with France and Spain, as well as all those that deal with internal security, defense, Andorran territory, diplomatic representation, and judicial or penal cooperation. Although the institution of the co-princes is viewed by some as an anachronism, the majority sees them as both a link with Andorra's traditions and a way to balance the power of Andorra's two much larger neighbors.

The way the two co-princes are chosen makes Andorra one of the most politically distinct nations on Earth. One co-prince is the current sitting president of France, currently Emmanuel Macron (it has historically been any head of state of France, including kings and emperors of the French). The other is the current Roman Catholic bishop of the Catalan city of La Seu d'Urgell, currently Joan Enric Vives i Sicilia. As neither prince lives in Andorra, their role is almost entirely ceremonial.

After the 2019 Andorran parliamentary election, the new government of the new prime minister was appointed on 20 May 2019 and became the first parity-based government in the nation's history.

Members of the Executive Council

References 

Politics of Andorra
Government of Andorra